Los Beverly de Peralvillo is a Mexican sitcom that copied its similar name as a spoof from "The Beverly Hillbillies" that originally had aired from 1962 to 1971. Meanwhile, Los Beverly De Peralvillo aired from 1969 to 1973, including 2 motion pictures based on the Television show. It stars Guillermo Rivas, Leonorilda Ochoa, Arturo Castro, and Amparo Arozamena as the main characters.

The series was a success and spawned two films, Los Beverly de Peralvillo (1971) and ¡Qué familia tan cotorra! (1973), and a follow-up series, Los nuevos Beverly.

Premise
El Borras is a taxi driver who falls in love with La Pecas. Not knowing that her shiftless family is waiting for someone to support them, Borras gladly marries her. Doña Chole, Pecas' mother, reveals the truth and forces Borras to provide for the whole family; Borras begins to detest her and calls her "La Tarantula". Borras relies on the help of his mustached friend, El Bigotón, who instantly becomes enamored of Doña Chole. El Comanche, the policeman who issues Borras' traffic citations, also falls in love with Doña Chole. The family lives in Colonia Peralvillo, a poor Mexico City neighborhood.

Cast and characters
 Guillermo Rivas as El Borras
 Leonorilda Ochoa as La Pecas
 Arturo Castro as El Bigotón
 Amparo Arozamena as Doña Chole
 Sergio Ramos as El Comanche
 César González as El Abuelo

Production
The series premiered on 28 October 1969 at 8:30 p.m. The series' intro billed the actors in this order: Rivas, Ochoa, Castro, and Arozamena; each character told an individual joke just before their credit appeared. The episodes were filmed in black-and-white until mid-1971, when they changed to color.

List of episodes
Season 1 (1969)
Released 28 October 1969
Released 4 November 1969
Released 9 December 1969
Released 16 December 1969
Released 23 December 1969

Impact
The sitcom could be assumed to be the forerunner of "comedic dysfunctional family" sitcoms of Mexico such as La familia P. Luche and Una familia de diez.

DVD releases
In 2006, 20 episodes of the series were released in two disc packages by Televisa Home Entertainment. The first DVD is "Los Beverly de Peralvillo Vol. 1" and the second is "Los Beverly de Peralvillo Vol. 2", both contain ten episodes. The DVDs' special features include a photo gallery and an interview with the series' writer, Mauricio Kleiff.

References

External links

Mexican television sitcoms
Las Estrellas original programming
1960s Mexican television series
1970s Mexican television series
1969 Mexican television series debuts
1973 Mexican television series endings
Television series about families